In eight-dimensional geometry, a truncated 8-simplex is a convex uniform 8-polytope, being a truncation of the regular 8-simplex.

There are four unique degrees of truncation. Vertices of the truncation 8-simplex are located as pairs on the edge of the 8-simplex. Vertices of the bitruncated 8-simplex are located on the triangular faces of the 8-simplex. Vertices of the tritruncated 8-simplex are located inside the tetrahedral cells of the 8-simplex.

Truncated 8-simplex

Alternate names
 Truncated enneazetton (Acronym: tene) (Jonathan Bowers)

Coordinates 
The Cartesian coordinates of the vertices of the truncated 8-simplex can be most simply positioned in 9-space as permutations of (0,0,0,0,0,0,0,1,2). This construction is based on facets of the truncated 9-orthoplex.

Images

Bitruncated 8-simplex

Alternate names
 Bitruncated enneazetton (Acronym: batene) (Jonathan Bowers)

Coordinates 
The Cartesian coordinates of the vertices of the bitruncated 8-simplex can be most simply positioned in 9-space as permutations of (0,0,0,0,0,0,1,2,2). This construction is based on facets of the bitruncated 9-orthoplex.

Images

Tritruncated 8-simplex

Alternate names
 Tritruncated enneazetton (Acronym: tatene) (Jonathan Bowers)

Coordinates 
The Cartesian coordinates of the vertices of the tritruncated 8-simplex can be most simply positioned in 9-space as permutations of (0,0,0,0,0,1,2,2,2). This construction is based on facets of the tritruncated 9-orthoplex.

Images

Quadritruncated 8-simplex

The quadritruncated 8-simplex an isotopic polytope, constructed from 18 tritruncated 7-simplex facets.

Alternate names
 Octadecazetton (18-facetted 8-polytope) (Acronym: be) (Jonathan Bowers)

Coordinates 

The Cartesian coordinates of the vertices of the quadritruncated 8-simplex can be most simply positioned in 9-space as permutations of (0,0,0,0,1,2,2,2,2). This construction is based on facets of the quadritruncated 9-orthoplex.

Images

Related polytopes

Related polytopes 

This polytope is one of 135 uniform 8-polytopes with A8 symmetry.

Notes

References
 H.S.M. Coxeter: 
 H.S.M. Coxeter, Regular Polytopes, 3rd Edition, Dover New York, 1973 
 Kaleidoscopes: Selected Writings of H.S.M. Coxeter, edited by F. Arthur Sherk, Peter McMullen, Anthony C. Thompson, Asia Ivic Weiss, Wiley-Interscience Publication, 1995,  
 (Paper 22) H.S.M. Coxeter, Regular and Semi Regular Polytopes I, [Math. Zeit. 46 (1940) 380-407, MR 2,10]
 (Paper 23) H.S.M. Coxeter, Regular and Semi-Regular Polytopes II, [Math. Zeit. 188 (1985) 559-591]
 (Paper 24) H.S.M. Coxeter, Regular and Semi-Regular Polytopes III, [Math. Zeit. 200 (1988) 3-45]
 Norman Johnson Uniform Polytopes, Manuscript (1991)
 N.W. Johnson: The Theory of Uniform Polytopes and Honeycombs, Ph.D. 
  x3x3o3o3o3o3o3o - tene, o3x3x3o3o3o3o3o - batene, o3o3x3x3o3o3o3o - tatene, o3o3o3x3x3o3o3o - be

External links 
 Polytopes of Various Dimensions
 Multi-dimensional Glossary

8-polytopes